The Great Maharsha Synagogue was a synagogue in Ostroh, named after Rabbi Shmuel Eidels.

It was built after 1627 under a restriction "prohibiting the erection of synagogues taller than churches." The synagogue was damaged during the Khmelnytsky massacres and centuries later, once again, during the Holocaust. It was used as a warehouse during the Soviet era, and later abandoned. Reconstruction of the ruins began in 2016 under the leadership of Hryhoriy Arshynov.

References

Synagogues destroyed by Nazi Germany
Baroque synagogues in Ukraine
Buildings and structures in Rivne Oblast